The  is a squadron of the Japan Air Self-Defense Force commanded from Kasuga Air Base in Fukuoka Prefecture. The actual aircraft are located at  nearby Fukuoka Airport. Under the authority of the Western Air Defense Force, the squadron operates Kawasaki T-4 aircraft.

References

Units of the Japan Air Self-Defense Force